Samuel Russell Hinds (July 11, 1953 – September 19, 2019) was a pitcher for the Milwaukee Brewers. He was selected in the 35th round of the  amateur draft by the St. Louis Cardinals, but never played for them. He made his major league debut in  against the Boston Red Sox. He finished playing baseball after the 1979 season, having made only three starts in his major league career. Hinds died on September 19, 2019 in Hanford, California.

References

External links

Baseball Almanac biography

1953 births
2019 deaths
Sportspeople from Frederick, Maryland
Baseball players from Maryland
Berkshire Brewers players
Danville Warriors players
Holyoke Millers players
Milwaukee Brewers players
Spokane Indians players
Thetford Mines Miners players
American expatriate baseball players in Canada